Rômulo Silvano da Silva, commonly known as Rômulo (born 26 August 1976) is a Brazilian football forward who plays for Ferroviário.

Playing career 

In the summer of 2008, Rômulo signed with Azerbaijan Premier League side Khazar Lankaran. Following a year in Azerbaijan he returned to Brazil for family reasons, and signed for Ceará.

Following his release from Khazar, Rômulo claim that he had not been paid in full for his time with Khazar, a matter that was taken to FIFA. In April 2012 FIFA recognised that the debt to Rômulo had been paid by Khazar on 30 March 2012 and that the 6 points stripped from Khazar was a mistake and they would be given back to them.

Club statistics Azerbaijan

Honours
Fortaleza
Campeonato Cearense 2008
Ceará
Campeonato Cearense 1999

References 

Brazilian footballers
Association football midfielders
1976 births
Living people
Ceará Sporting Club players
Ferroviário Atlético Clube (CE) players
Sport Club do Recife players
Clube Náutico Capibaribe players
Atlético Clube Goianiense players
Fortaleza Esporte Clube players
Khazar Lankaran FK players
Expatriate footballers in Azerbaijan
Brazilian expatriate footballers
Brazilian expatriate sportspeople in Azerbaijan